David Alan Mellor is a British curator, professor and writer. He has been awarded the Royal Photographic Society's J. Dudley Johnston Award and Education Award.

Life and career
David Mellor — as he was called before he wanted to avoid confusion with the politician of the same name — studied art at Sussex University under Quentin Bell. During this time Asa Briggs, then Vice-Chancellor of the University, received the archive of Mass-Observation from Tom Harrisson. Mellor has published and curated exhibitions about the substantial collection of pre-war photographs of working-class life contained in this archive.

Exhibitions curated by Mellor include Paradise Lost: The New Romantic Imagination in Britain (Barbican Centre, 1987); The Sixties (1993); and Co-Optic & Documentary Photography Group (Brighton Photo Biennial, 2014). As a professor of art at Sussex University, his students included Jeremy Deller.

Awards
2005: Royal Photographic Society's J. Dudley Johnston Award, shared with Ian Jeffrey
2015: Royal Photographic Society's Education Award

Publications

Publications by Mellor
Cecil Beaton. London: Jonathan Cape, 1994; ; coedited with Philippe Garner
Arthur Tress: Centric 52: Requiem for a Paperweight. Long Beach: California State University, University Art Museum, 1994;  
David Hiscock. London: Zelda Cheatle, 1995. 
Sixties London: The Photographs of Robert Whitaker 1965–70. Sydney: Art Gallery of New South Wales, 1996. 
The Only Blonde in the World: Pauline Boty, 1938–1966. London: AM Publications, 1998. ; with Sue Watling. 
Chemical Traces: Photography and Conceptual Art, 1968–1998. Kingston upon Hull: Kingston upon Hull City Museums & Art Galleries, 1998; .
The Barry Joule Archive: Works on Paper Attributed to Francis Bacon. Dublin: Irish Museum of Modern Art, 2000; .
The Sixties: Britain and France, 1962–1973: The Utopian Years. London: Philip Wilson, 2001; .
Tracing Light. Maidstone: Photoworks, 2001; ; with Garry Fabian Miller.
The Art of Robyn Denny. London: Black Dog, 2002; . 
Interpreting Lucian Freud. London: Tate, 2002; . 
Van Gogh vu par Bacon. Arles: Actes sud, 2002; ; Vincent van Gogh as seen by Francis Bacon, edited by Mellor and Yolande Clergue 
Liliane Lijn: Works 1959–80. Warwick: Mead Gallery, University of Warwick, 2005; 
No Such Thing as Society: Photography in Britain 1967–1987: From the British Council and the Arts Council Collection. London: Hayward Publishing, 2007; .
Antonioni's "Blow-up". Göttingen: Steidl, 2010. ; with Philippe Garner.
The Essential Cecil Beaton: Photographs 1920–1970. Munich: Schirmer Mosel, 2012. ; with Philippe Garner.
The Essential Cecil Beaton: Photographien 1920–1970. Munich: Schirmer Mosel, 2012. ; translated into German by Martina Tichy.
The Essential Cecil Beaton: Photographies 1920–1970. Malakoff: Hazan, 2012. ; translated into French by Patrick Bouthinon.
Cecil Beaton: Retrospectiva. Barcelona: Lunwerg, 2012. ; translated into Spanish by Arturo Muñoz Vico.
The Bruce Lacey Experience: Paintings, Sculptures, Installations and Performances. London: Camden Arts Centre, 2012; ; with Bruce Lacey.
Conflict, Time, Photography. London: Tate, 2014. ; with Simon Baker and Shoair Mavlian.
A Guide for the Protection of the Public in Peacetime. London: Archive of Modern Conflict, 2014; .

Publications with contributions by Mellor

References

Photography critics
British curators
Alumni of the University of Sussex
Academics of the University of Sussex
British art historians
Photography academics
Photography curators
Photography in the United Kingdom
Living people
Year of birth missing (living people)